Helena Concannon (28 October 1878 – 27 February 1952) was an Irish historian, writer, language scholar and Fianna Fáil politician.

Born in Maghera, County Londonderry, she attended secondary school in Dublin in Loreto North Great Georges Street and Loreto Stephen's Green. She attended university at the Royal University of Ireland in Belfast and then the National University of Ireland. She also studied abroad at the Sorbonne University Paris, Berlin University and in Rome. She was Professor of History at University College Galway.  In her youth Concannon, as well as her husband, was a member of "The Irish Fireside Club", which in the 1880s was the largest children's association in Ireland where children took responsibility upon themselves to teach others and themselves to make Ireland a better place.

Many of her writings were on the subject of Irish women, including Canon Sheehan's Woman Characters (1910), Women of Ninety Eight (1919), Daughters of Banba (1922), The Poor Clares in Ireland (1929), and Irish nuns in penal days (1931).

She was first elected to Dáil Éireann as a Fianna Fáil Teachta Dála (TD) at the 1933 general election for the National University constituency. At the 1938 general election, she was elected to Seanad Éireann for the National University of Ireland constituency. She was re-elected at each successive election and served in the Seanad until her death in 1952.

Her husband was the Irish scholar Tomás Bán Ó Conceanainn (Thomas Concannon), a national health inspector, and she authored several books as "Mrs Thomas Concannon".

University life and life as professor 
Concannon was educated by the Loreto nuns in Coleraine. In 1897, she studied modern languages at the Royal University of Ireland on a three-year scholarship. She studied abroad during these years as in 1899, she travelled to Germany and studied German in Berlin University accompanied by her friend, Mary Macken. Concannon then travelled to France to study French in Sorbonne. In 1900, Concannon graduated Bachelor of Arts with first class honours and went on to study Master of Arts in 1902 at the Royal University of Ireland. Concannon was fortunate to being one of the first generation of educated women.

In 1906, Concannon married Tomás Bán Ó Conceanainn who she met in 1900, when he arrived home from America. They settled down in County Galway where they shared the same love for the Irish Language and wrote many Irish texts. They had no children. In Galway, Concannon was a professor at University College Galway where she taught history, which mainly involved the history of Irish Women. In 1909, Concannon was offered a lectureship at University of College Dublin, in Italian, but the offer was then drawn before she could accept, so she decided to pursue the writing career.

Writing career
In 1909 she was offered a lecturer position at University College Dublin and after the offer was withdrawn she began her writing career. She produced over twenty books and published a number of works on religion, history of Ireland and Irish women's history. Her works were highly impacted by her political and nationalist views. Her 'analyses of Irish history was based on Catholicism and patriotism'. She was also an advocate of Irish language restoration.

Her first writings were love poems to her husband Tomás Bán Ó Conceanainn. These poems were 'simple, sensuous and passionate'.

She also produced a number of imaginative historical text for children. She used her married name for her publications and her first book was published in 1914 titled as A Garden of girls, or the famous schoolgirls of former days, it was about 'school life and education of real little girls'. Her next well known piece was the Life of St. Columban in 1915, which was a study about the Irish ancient monastic life and a biography of a sixth-century saint.

Two of her books, Daughters of Banba (1922) and St. Patrick (1932), received the Tailteann Medal for Literature, and The Poor Clares in Ireland (1929) won the National University Prize a DLitt higher doctorate degree for historical research.

Her most common publication the Women of Ninety Eight was dedicated to all the dead women and all the living ones who have given their loved ones. This book emerged on the ideologies of Catholicism and patriotism "praising the devotion of Irish nationalist women while emphasising the centrality of women's spiritual and domestic role in the home to the well-being of the nation" As this work was written during the time of the War of Independence, Concannon stressed the importance of women help during the rebellion as "they acted as messengers and intelligence officers", and in some cases, they fought as any men.

Life in the Dáil 
Concannon started her political career in Dáil Éireann, she was in the Dáil from 8 February 1933, after the 1933 general election, until 14 June 1937. She was as a Fianna Fáil TD for the National University of Ireland constituency.

Concannon, in 1933, voted 'Yes' along with 81 others for De Valera to become the President of the Executive Council.

In 1935, she voted for 'The Control of Imports Orders' Quota 2 and Quota 3 along with 65 other TDs in the first and 60 others in the latter. She voted yes with the majority on every issue posed on 13 February 1935

Concerning the 'Land Purchase (Guarantee Fund) Bill, 1935' which according to Bennet would have negatively impacted the rural middle class of which he was a representative, Bennet accuses Concannon and her fellow Dublin men of not caring about the people  of the country  "If Deputy Kelly, Deputy Donnelly or Deputy Mrs. Concannon were asked to apply a retrospective liability of this character to the citizens of Dublin, would they comply with the request? They know they would not. Because this Bill affects, in the main, the hardworking agriculturists, Deputy Kelly, Deputy Mrs. Concannon and other City Deputies can view it with equanimity."-Bennet Concannon went on to vote that the Dail should disagree with the Seanad propose bill with 71 others

Though, she was a TD in the Dáil as a university representative, she voted to annexe University representation in the Dáil, in following with her party's views, Leading one TD to saying, "I am very much surprised to see such a distinguished scholar and such a great contributor to Irish literature as Deputy Mrs. Concannon voting for the disfranchisement of the University that she has so well and so ably represented."-Mr. J.M. Burke

Concannon spoke on behalf of Irish women in the Dáil in 1936. She spoke on how Irish women a fundamental role in Ireland's agricultural economy and so more money should be put towards educating these women.

She did not contest the Dáil election of 1937.

Life in the Seanad 
Concannon was elected in the 1938 election to the Seanad Eireann for the National University of Ireland constituency. She was a popular figure and was re-elected each election in the Seanad until she died in office in 1952. Concannon was one of the minority voices against the role appointed to women in Éamon de Valera's constitution. Concannon was a member of the Seaned for 14 years.

List of publications
A Garden of Girls, or the Famous Schoolgirls of Former Days (London: Longmans, Green & Co. 1914).
The Life of St. Columban (St. Columbanus of Bobbio): A Study of Ancient Irish Monastic Life (Dublin: Catholic Truth Society of Ireland, 1915).
Women of ‘Ninety Eight. (Dublin: M. H. Gill, 1919).
Daughters of Banba. (Dublin: M. H. Gill, 1922).
The Poor Clares in Ireland. (A.D. 1629 – A.D. 1929), (Dublin: M.H. Gill, 1929)
St. Patric. His life and mission by Mrs Thomas Concannon (1932).
Irish Nuns in Penal Days. (London: Sands & Co., 1931)
The Curé of La Courneuve: L'Abbé  by Senator Helena Concannon (Dublin; M.H. Gill, 1945)
Poems. (Dublin: M. H. Gill, 1953)
Blessed Oliver Plunkett: Archbishop of Armagh and Primate of all Ireland, by Mrs. Thomas Concannon, with appendix by Robert C. Simington.(Dublin: Browne & Nolan, 1935).
The Queen of Ireland: An Historical Account of Ireland's Devotion to the Blessed Virgin (Dublin: M.H. Gill, 1938).

References

Sources
Dictionary of Nineteenth-century Irish Women Poets, pp. 233, Anne Ulry Colman, Kenny's Bookshop, Galway, 1996. .

1878 births
1952 deaths
Fianna Fáil TDs
Fianna Fáil senators
20th-century Irish historians
Irish women non-fiction writers
Irish poets
Irish women poets
Members of Seanad Éireann for the National University of Ireland
Members of the 2nd Seanad
Members of the 3rd Seanad
Members of the 4th Seanad
Members of the 5th Seanad
Members of the 6th Seanad
Members of the 7th Seanad
20th-century women members of Seanad Éireann
Members of the 8th Dáil
20th-century women Teachtaí Dála
People from County Londonderry
Politicians from County Galway
Teachtaí Dála for the National University of Ireland
Women historians
People educated at Loreto College, St Stephen's Green